The Czinger 21C is a hybrid sports car developed using artificial intelligence and 3D printed by the American car manufacturer Czinger Vehicles. Manufacturing began in 2021, with a planned production run of 80 units and deliveries starting Q1 2023.

Presentation
Designed, developed and built in Los Angeles, California, the Czinger 21C launches the new brand Czinger Vehicles named after its founder Kevin Czinger. The car was to be presented at the Geneva Motor Show in March 2020, but the show was canceled due to the COVID-19 pandemic. It was instead presented on March 11, 2020, in London during a special event.

Czinger Vehicles will produce only 80 units in two configurations: a road variant and a track variant called "Lightweight Track".

Technical characteristics
The 21C has a driver's seat in the central position and an in-line passenger seat behind that of the driver, minimizing the width of the cockpit.

The brake calipers and suspension components are combined into a single unit called the BrakeNode.

Powertrain
The 21C has a hybrid gasoline engine consisting of a bespoke twin-turbo V8 of  capacity in the rear central position associated with two electric motors located on the front and powered by a lithium titanate battery. The combination provides  at 10,500 rpm transmitted to the rear wheels via a seven-speed sequential transaxle with hydraulic actuated multi-plate clutch. A  horsepower option is also available.

See also 

 List of production cars by power output

Notes and references

External links 
 Official site of Czinger

Electric sports cars
Hybrid electric cars
First car made by manufacturer
Cars introduced in 2020